Žiga Zatežič (born 20 December 1995) is a Slovenian professional basketball player who last played for Krka-Telekom of the Telemach League.

References

External links
 Profile at abaliga.com
 Profile at eurobasket.com
 Profile at kzs.si

1995 births
Living people
Sportspeople from Novo Mesto
Slovenian men's basketball players
Shooting guards
KK Krka players
ABA League players